Christoph Steidl Porenta (born 1965) is a silversmith and goldsmith who lives and works in Slovenia. He is a knight of the Sovereign Order of Malta.

Early life
Steidl Porenta (born Schneck) was born in Munich, Bavaria in West Germany on 5 May 1965. He went to school in Pullach, and studied goldsmithing at Münsterschwarzach Abbey. He was inspired by the goldsmithing of René Lalique.

Work
In addition to being a silversmith and goldsmith, Steidl Porenta works with restoration. Since 1993, he lives and works in Ljubljana, Slovenia. His work has been exhibited in Germany, Italy and Slovenia and he is the only master silversmith in Slovenia. A journalist from Dnevnik said in 2019 that his works "surprise and inspire with their rich expressiveness and bear a modern stamp with a touch of the past, fairy tales, mysteries and a touch of anxiety, to counterbalance the perfection of beauty."

He has a shop and studio in Ljubljana, called Zlato runo. His work include ecclesiastical rings, the hands of the clock of a cathedral, glasses, cups and sculptures. He has made a reliquary to Francis of Assisi for the Bazilika Marije Pomagaj in Brezje.

In 2017, he designed an exhibition at the National Gallery of Slovenia, celebrating the 800th anniversary of the Order of Malta in Slovenia.

Personal life

Steidl Porenta moved to Slovenia since he had met a Slovenian woman and married her. He is a descendant of Melchior Steidl, (1657-1727), an Austrian baroque painter. 

As of 2013, since the late 1990s, he had a pet raven named Orhan. Steidl Porenta said that the bird was a useful companion, since it would indicate around noon that it was hungry, and so remind Steidl Porenta that he should also eat something.

Awards and honors
Steidl Porenta is a knight of the Sovereign Order of Malta.

References

External links

Christoph Steidl Porenta - zlatar, srebrokovač, restavrator, video from Plac
Srednjeveški kovanci, 2017  article, with picture gallery of Steidl Porenta and his shop

Living people
Slovenian people of German descent
Artists from Ljubljana
20th-century Slovenian male artists
21st-century Slovenian male artists
1965 births
Knights of Malta